Charles William Bradford (March 24, 1890 – death unknown) was an American Negro league pitcher between 1913 and 1927.

A native of Pittsburgh, Pennsylvania, Bradford made his Negro leagues debut in 1913 for the Philadelphia Giants, and pitched several seasons for Philadelphia. He went on to play for the Lincoln Giants, finishing his career with that club in 1927.

References

External links
 and Baseball-Reference Black Baseball stats and Seamheads

1890 births
Year of death missing
Place of death missing
Lincoln Giants players
Philadelphia Giants players
Baseball pitchers